The basic law on copyright in Burundi is  Law No. 1/021 of December 30, 2005, on the Protection of Copyright and Related Rights in Burundi. Burundi has not signed the Berne Convention but it has signed the TRIPS Agreement.

References

Burundi
Law of Burundi